The railway from Plouaret to Lannion is a regional railway line between Plouaret and Lannion in Côtes-d'Armor, France.

Route
The line begins in Plouaret-Trégor station, then passes the former Kérauzern station, and ends in Lannion station.

Line history
The line opened on November 13, 1881 and was electrified in 2000.

Photos of the 2 stations

References

Railway lines in Brittany